This is a shortened version of the sixteenth chapter of the ICD-9: Symptoms, Signs and Ill-defined Conditions. It covers ICD codes 780 to 799. The full chapter can be found on pages 455 to 471 of Volume 1, which contains all (sub)categories of the ICD-9. Volume 2 is an alphabetical index of Volume 1. Both volumes can be downloaded for free from the website of the World Health Organization.



Symptoms (780–789)
  General symptoms
  Alteration of consciousness
  Coma
  Transient alteration of awareness
  Persistent vegetative state
  Semicoma, stupor
  Hallucinations
  Syncope
  Convulsions
  Febrile convulsions
  Complex febrile convulsions
  Other convulsions
  Dizziness/vertigo, NOS
  Sleep disturbance, unspec.
  Unspecified sleep disturbance
  Insomnia with sleep apnea, unspecified
  Insomnia, unspecified
  Hypersomnia with sleep apnea, unspecified
  Hypersomnia, unspecified
  Disruptions of 24-hour sleep-wake cycle, unspecified
  Dysfunctions associated with sleep stages or arousal from sleep
  Unspecified sleep apnea
  Sleep related movement disorder, unspecified
  Other sleep disturbances
  Fever, nonperinatal
  Malaise and fatigue
  Chronic fatigue syndrome
  Functional quadriplegia
  Other malaise and fatigue
  Sweating, excessive
  Other general symptoms
  Fussy infant
  Crying, infant, excessive
  Memory loss
  Early satiety
  Other excessive crying
  Generalized pain
  Altered mental status
  Other general symptoms
  Symptoms involving nervous and musculoskeletal systems
  Abnormal involuntary movements
  Disturbances, smell and taste
  Gait abnormality
  Lack of coordination
 Dysdiadochokinesia
 Ataxia NOS
 Hypotonia
  Clubbing of fingers
  Neurologic neglect syndrome
  Other symptoms involving nervous and musculoskeletal systems
  Loss of height
  Abnormal posture
  Facial weakness
  Symptoms involving skin and other integumentary tissue
  Sensory disturbance skin
  Rash, nonvesicular, unspec.
  Localized swelling/mass, superficial
  Edema, localized, NOS
  Jaundice
  Cyanosis
  Petechiae
  Change in skin texture
  Other symptoms involving skin
  Symptoms concerning nutrition, metabolism and development
  Anorexia
 Loss of appetite
  Abnormal weight gain
  Abnormal loss of weight
  Feeding difficulties and mismanagement
  Lack of expected normal physiological development
  Polydipsia
  Polyphagia
  Other
  Symptoms involving head and neck
  Headache
  Throat pain
  Swelling mass or lump in head and neck
  Aphasia
  Voice disturbance
  Aphonia
  Hoarseness
  Dysarthria
  Other symbolic dysfunction
  Symbolic dysfunction, unspecified
  Alexia and dyslexia
  Epistaxis
  Hemorrhage from throat
  Other symptoms involving head and neck
  Postnasal drip
  Symptoms involving cardiovascular system
  Tachycardia
  Palpitations
  Murmur of heart, undiagnosed
  Other abnormal heart sounds
  Gangrene
  Shock, unspec.
  Shock unspecified
  Cardiogenic shock
  Septic shock
  Enlarged lymph nodes
  Bruit
  Symptoms involving respiratory system and other chest symptoms
  Dyspnea and respiratory abnormalities
  Apnea
  Cheyne-Stokes respiration
  Shortness of breath
  Tachypnea
  Wheezing
  Other respiratory abnormalities
 Bradypnea
  Stridor
  Cough
  Hemoptysis
  Abnormal sputum
  Chest pain, unspec.
  Precordial pain
  Pleuritic pain
  swelling, mass, or lump in chest
  Abnormal chest sounds
 Rales
  Hiccoughs
  Symptoms involving digestive system
  Nausea and vomiting
  Nausea w/vomiting
  Nausea, alone
  Vomiting, alone
  Heartburn
  Dysphagia
  Gas/bloating
  Visible peristalsis
  Abnormal bowel sounds
  Encopresis, NOS, fecal incontinence
  Other symptoms involving digestive system
  Diarrhea, NOS
  Symptoms involving urinary system
  Renal colic
  Dysuria
  Retention of urine
  Urinary incontinence
  Urinary incontinence unspecified
  Urge incontinence
  Stress incontinence
  Mixed incontinence
  Incontinence without sensory awareness
  Post-void dribbling
  Nocturnal enuresis
  Continuous leakage
  Overflow incontinence
  Other urinary incontinence
  Frequency of urination and polyuria
  Urinary frequency
  Polyuria
  Nocturia
  Oliguria and anuria
  Other abnormality of urination
  Urgency of urination
  Other symptoms involving abdomen and pelvis
  Abdominal pain
  Hepatomegaly
  Splenomegaly
  Abdominal/pelvic mass, unspec.
  Abdominal rigidity
  Ascites
  Abdominal tenderness

Nonspecific abnormal findings (790–796)
  Nonspecific findings on examination of blood
  Abnormal red blood cell
  Elevated sedimentation rate
  Abnormal glucose
  Impaired fasting glucose
  Impaired glucose tolerance test (oral)
  Other abnormal glucose
  Excessive blood level of alcohol
  Abnormal transaminase/LDH
  Other nonspecific abnormal serum enzyme levels
  Abnormal blood chemistry, other
 Iron overload disorder
  Bacteremia (not septicemia)
  Viremia, unspecified
  Other nonspecific findings on examination of blood
  Abnormal arterial blood gases
  Abnormal coagulation profile
  Abnormal prostate specific antigen
  Other
 Reticulocytosis
  Nonspecific findings on examination of urine
  Proteinuria
 Albuminuria
  Hemoglobinuria
  Glycosuria
  Nonspecific abnormal findings in other body substances
  Blood in stool, occult
  Nonspecific abnormal findings on radiological and other examination
  Abnormal X-ray, lung TERM: 9/30/11
  Mammogram, abnormal, unspec.
  Nonspecific abnormal results of function studies
  Peripheral nervous system and special senses
  Abnormal auditory function study
  Cardiovascular
  Abnormal electrocardiogram
  Nonspecific abnormal histological and immunological findings
  Nonspecific abnormal Papanicolaou smear of cervix
  Positive PPD TERM: 9/30/11
  Other nonspecific abnormal findings
  Elevated BP w/o hypertension

Ill-defined and unknown causes of morbidity and mortality (797–799)
  Senility without mention of psychosis
  Sudden death, cause unknown
  Sudden infant death syndrome
  Other ill-defined and unknown causes of morbidity and mortality
  Asphyxia
  Respiratory arrest
  Nervousness
  Debility
  Cachexia
  Other ill-defined conditions
  Decreased libido
  Other ill-defined conditions

International Classification of Diseases